David Thomas Wehrmeister (born November 9, 1952) is a former Major League Baseball pitcher.

Wehrmeister attended Lyons Township High School where he was a varsity Letter winner in baseball. He was the San Diego Padres' first-round pick, and third overall, in the January regular phase of the 1973 Major League Baseball Draft.

In , Wehrmeister got another brief chance at the majors, this time appearing in seven games in June and July before returning to the minors.

Wehrmeister became a free agent at the end of the season, and in January  he signed with the Chicago White Sox, for whom he had his best season statistically, recording his only ERA below 5.00 at 3.43, earning two of his four major league wins, and his only two major league saves. He pitched one more season for the minor league Buffalo Bisons in  before retiring.

References

External links

Major League Baseball pitchers
San Diego Padres players
New York Yankees players
Philadelphia Phillies players
Chicago White Sox players
Alexandria Aces players
Hawaii Islanders players
Columbus Clippers players
Portland Beavers players
Truman Bulldogs baseball players
Buffalo Bisons (minor league) players
Baseball players from Illinois
1952 births
Living people
People from Berwyn, Illinois
Sportspeople from the Chicago metropolitan area